The 1975 ABN World Tennis Tournament was a men's tennis tournament played on indoor carpet courts at Rotterdam Ahoy in the  Netherlands. It was part of the 1975 World Championship Tennis circuit. The tournament was held from 24 February through 2 March 1975. First-seeded Arthur Ashe won the singles title, his second after 1972.

Finals

Singles

 Arthur Ashe defeated  Tom Okker 3–6, 6–2, 6–4

Doubles
 Bob Hewitt /  Frew McMillan defeated  José Higueras /  Balázs Taróczy 6–2, 6–2

References

External links
 Official website 
 Official website 
 ATP tournament profile
 ITF tournament edition details

 
1975 in Dutch tennis
1975 World Championship Tennis circuit